Cintoia is a locality in Greve in Chianti in Tuscany, Italy, between Florence and Siena.

Cities and towns in Tuscany
Frazioni of the Province of Florence